The Wrong Box is a 1966 British comedy film produced and directed by Bryan Forbes from a screenplay by Larry Gelbart and Burt Shevelove, based on the 1889 novel The Wrong Box by Robert Louis Stevenson and Lloyd Osbourne. It was made by Salamander Film Productions and distributed by Columbia Pictures.

The cast includes a number of Britain's leading actors and comic actors of the time, including John Mills, Ralph Richardson, Michael Caine, Peter Cook, Dudley Moore, Peter Sellers, Irene Handl, Nanette Newman, Wilfrid Lawson, Cicely Courtneidge, and Tony Hancock. Also included are actors who later became more well-known, including John Le Mesurier, John Junkin, Leonard Rossiter, Nicholas Parsons, Jeremy Lloyd, Graham Stark, Thorley Walters, Norman Rossington, David Lodge, Juliet Mills, and Norman Bird. The Temperance Seven appear as themselves.

Plot
In the early 19th century, a lawyer explains to a group of young boys that a form of tontine has been organised; £1,000 has been invested for each child (£20,000 in total), but only the last survivor will receive all the capital and earned interest. Sixty-three years later, elderly brothers Masterman and Joseph Finsbury, who live next to each other in Victorian London, are the last surviving members of the tontine.

Masterman is attended by his unpromising medical student grandson Michael Finsbury, and, although Masterman has not talked to his despised brother in many years, he sends Michael next door to summon Joseph to see him. Michael is greeted by Julia, Joseph's granddaughter. They see each other often on the street and secretly admire each other. She explains Joseph is in Bournemouth with her cousins. Meanwhile, Julia's cousins, Morris and John, receive a telegram from Michael in their boarding house in Bournemouth, saying that Masterman is dying.

On the train trip to London, Joseph escapes from his grandson minders, entering a compartment and boring the sole occupant with a diatribe of trivial facts about the history of knitting. Joseph goes to smoke a cigarette, leaving behind his coat, which the occupant, "the Bournemouth Strangler", dons. The train then collides with another one. Morris and John find a mangled body wearing their uncle's coat and assume their uncle is dead. To protect their interest in the tontine, they hide the body in the woods. Morris tells John to crate the body up and post it to London. Meanwhile, Joseph wanders away from the accident scene.

In London, Michael gets a telegram telling him to expect a crate containing a statue. Morris arrives and mistakes the elderly butler, Peacock, for Masterman.

Morris decides to try to hide the body long enough for Masterman to die, and then claim Joseph died of a heart attack upon hearing the news. Morris and John plot to ship the body to Joseph's London home where Julia lives. John sends the body in a large barrel. Joseph makes his way to London on his own and visits his brother. Masterman makes several failed attempts to kill his brother, with Joseph oblivious to the attempts. They separate after quarrelling, and as he leaves the barrel containing the body is being delivered to Masterman's house by mistake, and Joseph hurriedly agrees to sign for the barrel for "Mr Finsbury". Minutes later, the crate containing the statue, also addressed to "Mr Finsbury", which Michael is expecting, is mistakenly delivered to Joseph's house and accepted by Julia who believes it is an expected delivery.

Morris, arriving at Joseph's house, sees a delivery wagon just leaving and assumes that his uncle's body has just been delivered. Morris then goes to Dr. Pratt to try to obtain a blank death certificate. Michael helps the delivery men move the crate into Joseph's house. This stirs the passions of both Julia and Michael and they kiss for the first time. Michael draws back and says they cannot do this because they are cousins; then they discover that they were both adopted orphans, thus unrelated by blood.

Michael discovers the body in the barrel and, after learning of the "altercation" between Masterman and Joseph from Peacock, assumes that his grandfather killed his brother. When Julia arrives with some broth for Masterman, Michael hides the body in a piano. That night, Michael hires "undertakers" to dump the corpse into the Thames, but when they arrive, Masterman has just fallen down the staircase, so they take his unconscious body. Seeing this, Morris gleefully assumes Masterman has died.

Morris and John go to claim the tontine, producing the fake death certificate. The lawyer tells them it is now worth £111,000.

Rescued from the river, Masterman is returned home by the Salvation Army, who assume he drowned himself. Julia orders a fancy coffin for him. Morris orders a cheap coffin to remove the mutilated body, but it is delivered to the wrong house, and Michael sells the piano, unaware the body is still in it. The police become involved when that body is discovered. Masterman sits up as the coffin is being taken away.

The cousins make off with the tontine money in a hearse. Michael and Julia chase Morris and John aboard another hearse. They then encounter a real funeral procession. After a confusing crash, Morris and John realise they have a body instead of the money. The tontine money is about to be buried when they grab it and run off. The box bursts open, and money is blown around the cemetery. Joseph pops up from the open grave just as Masterman arrives. The lawyer arrives to say the tontine has yet to be won. The police detective arrives, and Morris is arrested. They ask who put the body in the piano, as there is a £1000 reward for catching the Bournemouth Strangler. A new argument begins.

Cast
 John Mills as Masterman Finsbury
 Ralph Richardson as Joseph Finsbury
 Michael Caine as Michael Finsbury
 Peter Cook as Morris Finsbury
 Dudley Moore as John Finsbury
 Nanette Newman as Julia Finsbury
 Peter Sellers as Dr. Pratt
 Tony Hancock as Detective
 Valentine Dyall as Oliver Pike Harmsworth
 Leonard Rossiter as Vyvyan Alistair Montague (killed in tontine)
 Wilfrid Lawson as Peacock
 Thorley Walters as Lawyer Patience
 Cicely Courtneidge as Major Martha
 Diane Clare as Mercy 
 Gerald Sim as First Undertaker
 Irene Handl as Mrs. Hackett
 John Le Mesurier as Dr. Slattery
 Nicholas Parsons as Alan Frazer Scrope
 James Villiers as Sydney Whitcombe Sykes
 Graham Stark as Ian Scott Fife (killed in tontine)
 Jeremy Lloyd as Brian Allen Harvey
 Peter Graves as Military Officer
 John Junkin as 1st Engine Driver
 Timothy Bateson as Official
 Norman Bird as Spiritual
 Norman Rossington as first hooligan

Production

Filming locations
Pinewood Studios, Iver, Buckinghamshire, was the main production base for the studio sets and many exteriors, with the Victorian London crescent exteriors being shot on Bath's historic Royal Crescent, complete with TV aerials on the roofs. The funeral coach and horse chase was filmed in St James's Square, Bath, and on Englefield Green, Surrey, and surrounding lanes.

Release

Reception
Bosley Crowther wrote in The New York Times, "Perhaps the best of the clowning is the little bit Mr. Sellers does as this drink-sodden, absent-minded skip-jack, fumbling foolishly and a little sadly among his cats. But Mr. Richardson is splendid as a scholarly charlatan, and Mr. Mills and Mr. Lawson are capital as a couple of fuddy-duddy crooks. Sure, the whole nutty business is tumbled together haphazardly in the script that has been written—or maybe scrambled—by Larry Gelbert and Burt Shevelove. Some sections and bits are funnier than others. Some are labored and dull. It is that sort of story, that sort of comedy. But it adds up to a lively lark"; while more recently, Dennis Schwartz called it a "Mildly amusing silly black comedy." AllMovie wrote, "By turns wacky and weird, The Wrong Box is a welcome alternative to standard issue film comedies."

In his autobiography What's it All About?, Michael Caine wrote of the movie's reception, that the film "is so British that it met with a gentle success in most places except Britain, where it was a terrible flop. I suppose this was because the film shows us exactly as the world sees us - as eccentric, charming and polite - but the British knew better that they were none of these things, and it embarrassed us."

Awards and nominations

References

External links
 
 
 
 

1966 films
1966 comedy films
British black comedy films
Films based on British novels
Films based on works by Robert Louis Stevenson
BAFTA winners (films)
Films directed by Bryan Forbes
Films scored by John Barry (composer)
Films with screenplays by Larry Gelbart
Films set in England
Films set in the 1880s
Films shot at Pinewood Studios
Columbia Pictures films
1960s English-language films
1960s British films